The Life Is Yours Tour is a tour by British indie rock band Foals which started on 20 April 2022 in support of the band's seventh studio album, Life Is Yours. The remaining dates from the band's Everything Not Saved Will Be Lost World Tour were rescheduled from April 2020 to April 2021 due to the COVID-19 pandemic. Ten months later, in March 2021, Foals rescheduled their remaining concerts to 2022.

Goat Girl, Shame, Yard Act, and Egyptian Blue supported Foals on select UK dates.

Background
In March 2019 Foals embarked on the Everything Not Saved Will Be Lost World Tour, playing until February 2020 in Singapore. The band's remaining tour dates were rescheduled to 2022 due to the COVID-19 pandemic.

In April 2022, 10 days before the tour commenced, it was re-branded to the 'Life Is Yours Tour' in support of their then-upcoming seventh studio album.

The Life Is Yours Tour is the band's first tour as a trio. Jack Freeman joined Foals on tour, playing bass, synthesizer and providing backing vocals and Joe Price joined on keyboards and synthesizer, taking the places of bassist Walter Gervers who departed in 2018, and Edwin Congreave who left the band in 2021.

In June 2022 Foals announced six UK dates in 2023 for intimate concerts. 

A few days later the band announced a 25-date headline tour in North America, starting in October and concluding in December 2022.

Set list
This set list is representative of the performance on 16 December 2022 in New York City, New York. It does not represent the set list at all concerts for the duration of the tour.

"Wake Me Up"
"The Runner"
"2001"
"Balloons"
"Olympic Airways"
"My Number"
"Black Gold"
"Birch Tree"
"2am"
"In Degrees"
"Spanish Sahara"
"Red Socks Pugie"
"Providence"
"Snake Oil"
"Mountain at My Gates"
Encore
"Inhaler"
"Two Steps, Twice"

Tour dates

Notes

References

2022 concert tours
2023 concert tours